Philipp Hieronymus Brinckmann or Brinkman (1709 – 21 December 1760) was a German painter and engraver

Life
He was a student of Johann Georg Dathan in Speyer. In 1733, he was named a court painter by Elector Charles Philipp in Mannheim. He was promoted to Director of the Malereikabinett (art advisors) in 1757. Later that same year, he became a member of the Geheimen Staatsrats (Secret Council of State).

As court painter, He was also involved in the Bibliothekskabinett (library advisors) of Electress Elisabeth Augusta at Mannheim Palace. At the Jesuit Church, he created frescoes and altarpieces.

As a landscape painter, he was influenced by the works of Salvator Rosa and Rembrandt. He received praise from Goethe in his book, Dichtung und Wahrheit.

Etchings
He etched some plates in a picturesque and spirited style. The following are his principal prints:

Philipp Hieronymus Brinkman; se ipse fec.
David with the Head of Goliath. 1741.
The Death of Pyramus.
The Repose in Egypt; Rembrandt inv.; Brinkman fec.
The Resurrection of Lazarus; Brinkman fec.
Mary Magdalene at the Feet of our Saviour.
Christ and the Samaritan Woman.
The Presentation in the Temple; P. J. Brinkman inv. et fec.
 Six pleasing Landscapes; Ph. Brink. del. et fec.

Sources
 
 
 Gustav Jacob: Philipp Hieronymus Brinckmann Ein Mannheimer Maler des 18. Jahrhunderts, In: Mannheimer Geschichtsblätter. 23 (1922), Nr. 9., Sp. 172–178 : Ill
 Ernst Emmerling: Philipp Hieronymus Brinckmann als Landschaftsmaler. In: Mitteilungen des Historischen Vereins der Pfalz, 58, Speyer 1960, pp. 317–325

External links

 More works by Brinckmann @ ArtNet

18th-century German painters
18th-century German male artists
German male painters
German engravers
People from Speyer
1709 births
1760 deaths